Central Hall (also known by its former name, Cathedral Hall) is a building that stands at the end of Brunswick Street in Fitzroy, Melbourne, Australia. This structure today serves as a centrepiece of Australian Catholic University's St. Patrick's Campus. It once held a similar role within Melbourne's Roman Catholic (and predominantly Irish) community, from the time the hall and adjoining clubrooms were opened in 1904.

Building of Cathedral Hall 

The first planning for the Catholic hall took place in 1901. Archbishop Thomas Carr, and the Dean Phelan, made several announcements to their parishioners at Mass and in parish meetings relating about a proposed hall. At this stage, the hall was to be built on the grounds of St. Patrick's Cathedral, facing north on Albert Street. By October 1902 this idea had been abandoned since the hall would have obscured the view of the cathedral from Albert Street (heading west to the cathedral).

On 8 November of the same year, Archbishop Carr announced at Saturday evening Mass that the Archdiocese had acquired a property on Brunswick Street, a former boot factory built in 1873, which had been designed by architects Reed & Barnes. The property had come at a 'very moderate' cost of £4,200. The project involved refurbishing the factory building as clubrooms, with a large new hall built to the rear, designed by the same architects who had done the factory, by then known as Reed Tappin & Smart.

The foundation stone of the hall was laid by the Archbishop at a ceremony on Sunday 26 April 1903. The clubrooms in the old factory structure were opened in June, but the hall itself was finished about a month behind schedule, and was not able to host the St. Patrick's night celebrations on 17 March 1904 as first hoped. Instead, the grand opening took place on Sunday, 10 April, with over 2,000 people crowding the hall (which had a capacity of 1,100).

The relatively austere composition of the factory front to Brunswick Street was transformed into a more elaborate yet restrained and dignified facade for the new purpose. The elaborate plasterwork of the hall ceiling, proscenium and balcony was seen by contemporaries as an aesthetic triumph. The plasterwork described as 'in the German Renaissance style' was repainted in shades of sage green, cream and buff in 1913.

History 

Central Hall has been put to many different uses since it opened in April 1904. During the 1920s the hall played host to jazz nights, and in the postwar period, Cathedral Hall hosted Italian dances each Sunday night for many years.

Central Hall (as it became known from the 1960s) is best known for hosting the TF Much Ballroom of the early 1970s. T. F. Much Ballroom was a major Melbourne music and cultural event. Bands which made a name for themselves at Ballroom events include Daddy Cool in 1970–71. Other bands to play at the hall during the 1970s included Spectrum, Midnight Oil, Indelible Murtceps, and Tamam Shud.

By the late 1980s, Central Hall had even become a venue for Victorian state boxing matches and title fights.

Central Hall and Australian Catholic University 

While still owned by the Archdiocese of Melbourne, Australian Catholic University was granted the use of Central Hall, and became the scene of the opening of St. Patrick's campus on 28 July 2000. The hall is regularly used for all of ACU's theatrical activities, while the Recital Room (formerly the Supper Room) with the hall also accommodates the university's music students, and other classes when absolutely necessary. Central Hall has undergone restoration in the early 2000s, and was added to the Victorian Heritage Register in 2003.

References 

Buildings and structures in the City of Yarra
Music venues in Melbourne
Buildings and structures completed in 1904
Fitzroy, Victoria
1904 establishments in Australia
Catholicism in Australia